The Scunthorpe & District Football League is a football league formed in 1921 catering for clubs in and around Scunthorpe, England. It is not a formal member of the English football pyramid.

Due to a sponsorship deal, the league is currently known as the TSW Printers Scunthorpe & District Football League.

Member clubs 2015–16

Division One
Barnetby United
Bottesford Town Reserves
Broughton Colts
Brumby
College Wanderers
Crosby Colts
Epworth Town
Limestone Rangers
Scotter United

Division Two
Ashby Royal Antediluvian Order of Buffaloes
Crosby Colts Reserves
Crowle Town Colts
East Drayton
Epworth Town Reserves
New Holland Villa
Scunthonians
Westwoodside Rangers

Division Three
AFC Queensway
Barnetby United Reserves
Briggensians
College Wanderers Reserves
Crowle Town Colts Reserves
Limestone Rangers Reserves
Midtown United
Santon
Scotter United Reserves
The Butchers Arms

Recent champions

Further reading
 Duke, Vic (2008), A History of the Scunthorpe and District Football League, Iron City Publications,

External links
Scunthorpe & District League at FA Full-Time

Football leagues in England
Sport in Scunthorpe
Sports leagues established in 1921
1921 establishments in England